Running with Scissors with Mr. Interesting was a six-part radio series broadcast on CBC Radio One Saturday afternoons during the third hour of Definitely Not the Opera during the summer of 1999. It starred Dan Redican reprising the title role from The Frantics' Frantic Times radio series. The show was described as a collection "unrelated sketches loosely tied together by a large man with a gravelly voice and a slightly foreign sounding accent."

The shows were recorded live from the stage at Toronto's The Rivoli. Over the course of the series the show featured performances by Diane Black, Jenny Hacker, Diane Wilson, Kathryn Greenwood and Johnathan Wilson.

The show marked Dan Redican's first return to CBC radio since the conclusion of the last series by The Frantics, The Frantics Look at History in 1988.

CBC Radio One programs
Canadian radio sketch shows
1999 radio programme debuts
1999 radio programme endings